The discography of American rapper, Keith Murray consists of nine studio albums, two collaborative albums, one compilation album and fourteen singles.

Studio albums

Collaboration albums

Compilation albums

Singles

As featured artist

As collaborating artist
1993
"Swing It Over Here" (Erick Sermon Feat. Redman and Keith Murray)
1994
"Newark To C.I." (Shaquille O'Neal Feat. Keith Murray)
"Be Happy (Remix)" (Mary J. Blige Feat. Keith Murray)
"Cosmic Slop" (Redman Feat. Erick Sermon and Keith Murray)
1995
"I Shot Ya" (LL Cool J Feat. Keith Murray)
"Genetic For Terror" (Jamal Featuring Erick Sermon, Keith Murray, L.O.D, Redman)
"Tell 'Em" (Erick Sermon Feat. Keith Murray and Roz)
1996
"Live Wires Connect" (UGK Feat. Keith Murray)
"Da Ill Out" (Redman feat. Jamal and Keith Murray)
"Flipmode Squad Meets Def Squad" (Busta Rhymes feat. Jamal, Redman, Keith Murray, Rampage and Lord Have Mercy)
"Pay Ya Dues" (Frankie Cutlass Feat. Keith Murray, Busta Rhymes, Cocoa Brovaz)
1997
"Off The Wall" (Tha Alkaholiks Feat. Keith Murray)
"K.I.M." (EPMD Feat. Keith Murray And Redman)
1998
"Down South Funk" (Redman Feat. Erick Sermon and Keith Murray)
1999
"The Right Time" (Cherrelle Feat. Keith Murray)
2001
"Now Whut's Up" (Erick Sermon Feat. Redman, Keith Murray and Sy Scott)
"Up Them Thangs" (Erick Sermon Feat. Redman and keith Murray)
"Music (Remix)" (Erick Sermon Feat. Redman and Keith Murray)
"Wrong 4 That" (Redman Feat. Keith Murray)
2002
"Special Delivery Remix (P.Diddy feat. G-Dep, Ghostface Killah, Keith Murray & Craig Mack)
""Say It Ain't So" (Birdman Feat. Boo, Gotti, Mannie Fresh, Keith Murray & Mikkey)
"Fans (Clap Your Hands) (Kali Fam Feat. Keith Murray, Nelly and Redman)
"Hold Up Dub" (Erick Sermon Feat. Keith Murray)
2004
"Listen" (Erick Sermon Feat. Keith Murray and Sy Scott)
2009
"Errbody Scream" (Method Man & Redman Feat. Keith Murray)
 "Cultivation" (O.S.T.R. Feat. Keith Murray, Kochan)
2010
"Caes (Último Cigarro)" (Capaz feat. Keith Murray)
2011
"Word Up" (Grand Puba Feat. Keith Murray)
"You & Me" (Joe Coudie Feat. Keith Murray)
2013
"Bad" (AON Hence ft. Keith Murray 4th Quarter)
2015
"Murder Swagg" (Curt Digga Feat. Keith Murray)

Guest appearances
1995 - "Freestyle" (Feat. Redman, Funkmaster Flex, The Mix Tape, Vol. 1). Loud
1995 - "Get Lifted" (Jive West 25th Vol. 2, Various Artists). Jive
1995 - "East Left" (New Jersey Drive, Vol. 1, Various Artists). Tommy Boy
1996 - "Live Wires Connect" (Feat. UGK and Lord Jamar, Don't Be a Menace to South Central While Drinking Your Juice in the Hood: The Soundtrack). Island
1997 - "Rapper's Delight" (Feat. Redman and Erick Sermon, In tha Beginning...There Was Rap). Priority
1998 - "Freestyle" (Funkmaster Flex, The Mix Tape, Vol. III). Loud
1998 - "Independence Day" (Feat. Too Short, Nationwide: Independence Day). Jive 
2001 - "He's Back" (Rush Hour 2 Soundtrack, Various Artists). Def Jam
2001 - "Freestyle" (Funkmaster Flex, Special Delivery - Freestyle EP Part 2). Fat Beats

References

Discographies of American artists
Hip hop discographies